Tavida Kamolvej (Thai: ทวิดา กมลเวชช) is a Thai academic and politician, currently serving as a Deputy Governor of Bangkok. Prior to her appointment, she was dean of the political science faculty at Thammasat University. Kamolvej is a specialist on disaster management.

Career 
Kamolvej is charged with addressing disasters and public health.

References 

Tavida Kamolvej
Living people
Tavida Kamolvej
University of Pittsburgh alumni
Year of birth missing (living people)